Pat Cummings (1956–2012) was an American basketball player.

Pat Cummings may also refer to:

Pat Cummings (illustrator) (born 1950, American illustrator and writer

See also
Patrick Cumming (1741–1820), Scottish professor
Pat Cummins (born 1993), Australian international cricketer
Patrick Cummins (disambiguation)